The Yuen Long District Council is the district council for the Yuen Long District in Hong Kong. It is one of 18 such councils. The Yuen Long District currently consists of 45 members, of which the district is divided into 39 constituencies, electing a total of 39 with 6 ex officio members who are the Shap Pat Heung, San Tin, Ha Tsuen, Kam Tin, Ping Shan and Pat Heung rural committee chairmen. The latest election was held on 24 November 2019.

History
The Yuen Long District Council was established on 1 April 1981 under the name of the Yuen Long District Board as the result of the colonial Governor Murray MacLehose's District Administration Scheme reform. The District Board was partly elected with the ex-officio Regional Council members and chairmen of six Rural Committees, Shap Pat Heung, San Tin, Ha Tsuen, Kam Tin, Ping Shan and Pat Heung, as well as members appointed by the Governor until 1994 when last Governor Chris Patten refrained from appointing any member.

The Yuen Long District Board became Yuen Long Provisional District Board after the Hong Kong Special Administrative Region (HKSAR) was established in 1997 with the appointment system being reintroduced by Chief Executive Tung Chee-hwa. The current Yuen Long District Council was established on 1 January 2000 after the first District Council election in 1999. The appointed seats were abolished in 2015 after the modified constitutional reform proposal was passed by the Legislative Council in 2010.

The Yuen Long District Council is one of the fastest growing council due to the development of the new towns of Yuen Long and Tin Shui Wai, and has become the largest council of the territory. It had been tightly dominated by the rural forces due to its vast rural areas and the ex-officio rural committee representatives. The chairmanship of the council had been taken by rural or rural-related councillors, such as Tai Kuen, chairman from 1985 to 1999, was a rural strongman; Tang Siu-tong, chairman from 2000 to 2007, was a rural leader which represented the Hong Kong Progressive Alliance and was elected to the Legislative Council in 2000 on the pro-Beijing Democratic Alliance for the Betterment of Hong Kong (DAB) ticket; Leung Che-cheung, chairman from 2008 to 2015, was a member of the DAB and president of the New Territories Association of Societies (NTAS) who has been Legislative Councillor since 2012.

The Tin Shui Wai new town was also dominated by the pro-Beijing forces. The pro-democrats have limited influence in the district, such as Zachary Wong and Kwong Chun-yu in Long Ping Estate and the pro-Taipei Democratic Alliance's Johnny Mak in Fung Cheung. On the capacity of Yuen Long District Councillor, Kwong was elected to the Legislative Council through the District Council (Second) constituency in 2016.

The pro-Beijing and rural domination was turned over in the 2019 historic landslide victory where the pro-democrats took over all the urban constituencies and a few rural constituencies amid the massive pro-democracy protests. All pro-Beijing councillors in Tin Shui Wai including Luk Chung-hung of the Hong Kong Federation of Trade Unions (FTU) being unseated and some rural incumbents were also surprisingly defeated. As a result, the pro-democrats took 33 of the 39 elected seats and seized control of the 45-member council for the first time.

Political control
Since 1982 political control of the council has been held by the following parties:

Political makeup

Elections are held every four years.

District result maps

Members represented
Starting from 1 January 2020:

Leadership

Chairs
Since 1985, the chairman is elected by all the members of the board:
 
|}

Vice Chairs

Notes

References

External links
 Yuen Long District Council

 
Districts of Hong Kong
Yuen Long District